There are three different paradoxes called Bertrand's paradox or the Bertrand paradox:
 Bertrand paradox (probability)
 Bertrand paradox (economics)
 Bertrand's box paradox 
Not to be confused with the famous paradox discovered by Bertrand Russell.